Cyrtinini is a tribe of longhorn beetles of the subfamily Lamiinae.

Taxonomy
 Boricyrtinus
 Brachyrhabdus
 Cyrtillus
 Cyrtinus
 Decarthria
 Diastophya
 Gracilosphya
 Haplorhabdus
 Leptocyrtinus
 Odontorhabdus
 Oloessa
 Omosarotes
 Sciocyrtinus
 Scopadus

References